Sailor's Holiday is a 1944 American comedy film directed by William Berke and starring Arthur Lake, Jane Lawrence and Bob Haymes.

Plot

Cast 
 Arthur Lake as 'Marblehead' Tomkins 
 Jane Lawrence as Clementine Brown 
 Bob Haymes as Bill Hayes 
 Shelley Winters as Gloria Flynn 
 Lewis Wilson as Jerome 'Iron Man' Collins 
 Edmund MacDonald as Fred Baxter 
 Ann Miller as Ann Miller 
 Vi Athens as Maid 
 Eddie Bruce as Radio Announcer 
 Heinie Conklin as Air Raid Warden 
 Harry Depp as Photographer 
 Jack Evans as Mug 
 George Ford as Ronald Blair 
 Jack Gordon as Wolfman 
 Harrison Greene as Justice of the Peace 
 Dick Jensen as Policeman Swing 
 Eddie Laughton as Guard 
 Pat O'Malley as Studio Guide 
 Joe Palma as King's Guard 
 Herbert Rawlinson as Director 
 Harry Semels as King's Guard 
 Ben Taggart as Director 
 Harry Tenbrook as Laundry Man
 Nick Thompson as Indian 
 George Tyne as Assistant Director 
 John Tyrrell as Guard 
 Blackie Whiteford as Mug 
 Mary Zavian as Hedy Lamarr's Double

References

Bibliography
 Hal Erickson. Military Comedy Films: A Critical Survey and Filmography of Hollywood Releases Since 1918. McFarland, 2012.

External links

1944 films
1944 comedy films
American comedy films
1940s English-language films
Columbia Pictures films
Films directed by William A. Berke
1940s American films